Domenica Cinque is an Italian entertainment television news program broadcast every Sunday on Canale 5 and rerun on Mediaset Plus and Mediaset Extra. It was produced in collaboration with Videonews. In 2012 it was cancelled due to low audience, and afterward replaced by Domenica Live with Barbara D'Urso as host.

Mediaset
Infotainment
Italian television talk shows
2009 Italian television series debuts
2012 Italian television series endings
2000s Italian television series
2010s Italian television series
Canale 5 original programming